Kawanku (My Friend) was an Indonesian weekly magazine for teenage girls. It was first published in 1970 as a children's magazine. Kawanku focused on fashion and celebrities and offered information about the latest entertainment and feature stories on current issues and events. The magazine was published by Kompas Gramedia. Its headquarters was in Jakarta.

Taglines
Pasti Tau Yang Cewek Mau (1993-2009)
Unbeatable Fun Girl (2009-2015)
Cewek Banget (2016)

Website Revision
Before Kawanku magazine was stop publishing, a new website CewekBanget.id has launched in January 2017.

References

External links
 

1970 establishments in Indonesia
2016 disestablishments in Indonesia
Celebrity magazines
Fashion magazines
Defunct magazines published in Indonesia
Indonesian-language magazines
Kompas Gramedia Group
Magazines established in 1970
Magazines disestablished in 2016
Magazines published in Jakarta
Teen magazines
Weekly magazines